Allocasuarina acuaria is a shrub of the genus Allocasuarina native to the Wheatbelt, Goldfields-Esperance and Great Southern regions of Western Australia.

The cone is often obscured by the elongate bracteoles. It is found in heath areas of white-yellow sand.

The species was first formally described as Casuarina acuaria by the botanist Ferdinand von Mueller in 1867 in the Journal of Botany, British and Foreign. It was reclassified in 1982 into the genus Allocasuarina by Lawrence Alexander Sidney Johnson in the Journal of the Adelaide Botanic Gardens.

References

acuaria
Rosids of Western Australia
Fagales of Australia
Plants described in 1867
Taxa named by Ferdinand von Mueller
Dioecious plants